Jean-Marc Martinez (born 19 July 1956) is a French former professional footballer who played as a midfielder. During his career, he scored 45 goals in 287 games in the first two tiers of French football.

Coaching career 
Following his retirement from his playing career, Martinez became a youth football coach. From 2002 to 2004, he was a youth coach for Emirati club Al Ain. He was then contracted to the Kuwait Football Association from 2004 to 2008. Martinez then spent one year as a youth coach for Kuwaiti club Al-Arabi before joining Qatari club Al Sadd in the same position, where he also stayed one year.

Honours 
Marseille

 Coupe de France: 1975–76

References 

1956 births
Living people
People from Relizane
Pieds-Noirs
French footballers
Association football midfielders
FC Martigues players
Olympique de Marseille players
Olympique Lyonnais players
Ligue 2 players
Ligue 1 players
Division d'Honneur players
Association football coaches
French expatriate sportspeople in the United Arab Emirates
French expatriate sportspeople in Kuwait
French expatriate sportspeople in Qatar